Mikhail Youdin (29 September 1893 St. Petersburg – 8 February 1948 Kazan)  was a Russian composer. He studied at Saint Petersburg Conservatory, where he began teaching in 1926,  and is best remembered for his 1943 opera Farida.

Youdin earned the nickname "Russian Bach" because of his career spent composing large scale ensembles, oratorios and cantatas.

References

1893 births
1948 deaths
20th-century classical composers
Russian male classical composers
Russian opera composers
Male opera composers
20th-century Russian male musicians